Polanówka  is a village in the administrative district of Gmina Wilków, within Opole Lubelskie County, Lublin Voivodeship, in eastern Poland.

Polanówka is a birthplace of Józef Gosławski - Polish sculptor and medallic artist.

References

Villages in Opole Lubelskie County